Denis Rugovac (born 3 April 1993) is a Czech road and track cyclist, who currently rides for . He competed at the 2018 and 2020 UEC European Track Championships.

Major results

Track

2011
 1st  Madison, National Junior Track Championships (with Jan Kraus)
2013
 3rd  Team pursuit, European Under-23 Track Championships
2014
 National Track Championships
1st  Team pursuit (with Jan Kraus, Nicolas Pietrula & Michael Kohout)
2nd Points race
2016
 2nd Madison, National Track Championships
2017
 National Track Championships
2nd Team pursuit
3rd Points race
3rd Individual pursuit
2018
 National Track Championships
2nd Points race
2nd Team pursuit
3rd Scratch
2019
 3rd Team pursuit, National Track Championships
2020
 2nd Madison, National Track Championships

Road
2009
 3rd  Road race, European Youth Summer Olympic Festival
2013
 4th Time trial, National Under-23 Road Championships
2019
 10th V4 Special Series Debrecen–Ibrany
2020
 9th GP Slovakia

References

External links

1993 births
Living people
Czech male cyclists
Czech track cyclists
Sportspeople from Plzeň